The 2009–10 season was Panionios' 49th season in Super League Greece. On summer Boško Balaban from Dinamo Zagreb, Sito Riera from Espanyol and other players transferred to Panionios. The team finished in the 9th place in Super League Greece.

Current squad

Transfers

In

Out

Matches

Super League

First round

Second round

Greek Cup
Fourth Round

Fifth Round

Quarter-Finals

Top goalscorers
9 goals
 Boško Balaban (8 in Super League, 1 in Greek Cup)
5 goals
 Fanouris Goundoulakis (5 in Super League)
 Sito Riera (4 in Super League, 1 in Greek Cup)
3 goals
 Martin Latka (3 in Super League)
 Bennard Yao Kumordzi (3 in Super League)
 Suleiman Omo (3 in Super League)
1 goal
 Manolis Skoufalis (1 in Super League)
 Carlos Casteglione (1 in Super League)
 Fabián Estoyanoff (1 in Super League)
 Davor Kukec (1 in Super League)

Panionios F.C. seasons
Panionios